is a Japanese professional baseball pitcher for the Yomiuri Giants of the Nippon Professional Baseball (NPB).

Career

College career
Sugano went to Tokai University, where he had a 37–4 win–loss record and a 0.57 earned run average (ERA). In 2010, he set a career-high  in college.

2011 NPB draft 
Sugano was a top pitching prospect for the October 2011 NPB draft. Prior to the draft selection, he declared his desire to join the Yomiuri Giants and play under the guidance of his uncle, the present Giants manager Tatsunori Hara. The Hokkaido Nippon-Ham Fighters also decided to select him as their first pick. The two teams fought it out via lottery, but the Fighters drew the lucky straw in the end, to the surprise and disappointment of Manager Hara and the Giants for they had assumed no other team would dare pick Sugano.

Both Sugano's father and grandfather were disappointed because they were not notified of the Fighters' intention to draft him, the latter even quoted saying it was a violation of human rights. The Fighters did admit to having intentionally kept their intention to draft Sugano unannounced, and apologized for the surprise and the commotion they caused.

After long consideration and deliberation with his family, Sugano finally announced on November 21 his decision to turn down the Fighters' offer and instead take the year off and re-enter the 2012 NPB draft. "I may be taking a longer route (to becoming a professional ballplayer), but my childhood dream (of playing for the Giants) was stronger," he said, hinting at his intention to wait until the Giants win the rights to negotiate with him. He also mentioned that he wasn't as upset about not being informed by the Fighters ahead of time that they might select him, but rather because they promised they wouldn't select him. Only two players in NPB history have turned down the Fighters: Shinji Kuroda in 1976 and Ikuo Takayama in 1980.

Having no team to play for, he then stayed with Tokai University for another year using the "graduation postponement system" established for students who are unable to land post-graduation jobs while they are still in college. He was not allowed to play in Tokai's official games, but this did not sway him enough to join the Industrial League for it would have taken at least two years before he could have been drafted again.

Yomiuri Giants

Sugano was selected as the Giants' first pick in 2012.
In his rookie year, Sugano was named Climax Series MVP and made his first of six consecutive NPB All star games.

In 2014, Sugano won the Central League MVP and his first ERA title.

In 2017, Sugano won his first Eiji Sawamura Award, becoming the first Giants pitcher to ever win both the Eiji Sawamura Award and Central League MVP since Masumi Kuwata.  

In 2018, Sugano won his second consecutive Eiji Sawamura Award, and achieved the pitching triple crown, leading the league in strikeouts, ERA and wins. He threw a postseason no hitter against the Yakult Swallows, eliminating them from the postseason.

In 2019 Sugano finished the season with an ERA of 3.89, the worst of his career. He also threw the fewest innings of his NPB career, had his fewest strikeouts and his home run rate was twice that of his career rate. 

After the 2020 season, on December 8, 2020, the Giants announced it was allowing Sugano to enter the posting system to play in Major League Baseball (MLB).

On January 7, 2021, Sugano's posting period ended and he didn't sign with an MLB team, re-signing with the Giants.

International career
Sugano played for the Japan national baseball team at the 2015 WBSC Premier12, winning a bronze medal. At the 2017 World Baseball Classic Sugano tied with fellow Team Japan pitcher Kodai Senga for the tournament lead in strikeouts with 16; but Japan fell in the semi-finals to the eventual tournament winner Team USA, 2–1. 

Sugano was selected to participate in the 2018 MLB Japan All-Star Series, but declined due to concerns about his physical condition.

Playing style
Sugano is a 6 ft 1 in (186 cm), 210 lb (95 kg) right-handed pitcher. Although Sugano threw 98 mph in college, his fastball velocity was down since the beginning of his professional career. The Giants confirmed that he had ligament damage in his right elbow during the 2014 season. After rehab he set a pro career-high 96 mph in 2016.

With a three-quarters delivery Sugano throws two fastballs (four-seam, shuuto/sinker) sitting 90-93 mph, a solid slider, a curveball, and a forkball. He has excellent command, posting a BB/9 of 1.8 in his NPB career.

References

External links

 NPB stats

1989 births
Living people
Baseball people from Kanagawa Prefecture
Japanese baseball players
National baseball team players
Nippon Professional Baseball MVP Award winners
Nippon Professional Baseball pitchers
Tokai University alumni
Yomiuri Giants players
2015 WBSC Premier12 players
2017 World Baseball Classic players